A tree caliper is a special caliper to measure the diameter at breast height of a tree. When used in forestry, the term "caliper" can refer to the diameter of a tree's trunk at breast height itself.

"Caliper measurements on young trees are taken 6 inches above the soil. Once a tree's caliper exceeds 4 inches, the tree is measured at a height of 12 inches."

There are a considerable number of designs of the tool.

References

External links 

Forestry tools
Length, distance, or range measuring devices